Castelnuovo di Val di Cecina is a comune (municipality) in the Province of Pisa in the Italian region Tuscany, located about  southwest of Florence and about 70 km southeast of Pisa.

Castelnuovo di Val di Cecina borders the following municipalities: Casole d'Elsa, Monterotondo Marittimo, Montieri, Pomarance, Radicondoli, Volterra.

References

External links

 

Cities and towns in Tuscany